Auckland Pride may refer to:
Auckland Pride Festival
Auckland rugby league team, who were known as the Auckland Pride in 2011 and 2012.